Sonny Rollins, Volume 1 is a jazz album by Sonny Rollins, his first effort for the Blue Note label. The original LP record, Blue Note release BLP-1542, did not distinguish the volume number in the title. It was simply called Sonny Rollins.

Track listing
All pieces by Rollins unless otherwise noted.

"Decision" - 8:03
"Bluesnote" - 7:01
"How Are Things in Glocca Morra?" (Burton Lane, E.Y. "Yip" Harburg) - 6:20
"Plain Jane" - 10:00
"Sonnysphere" - 9:36

Personnel
Sonny Rollins - tenor saxophone
Donald Byrd - trumpet
Wynton Kelly - piano
Gene Ramey - bass
Max Roach - drums

References

Sonny Rollins albums
1957 albums
Blue Note Records albums
Albums recorded at Van Gelder Studio
albums produced by Alfred Lion